The Rosa Luxemburg Foundation, named in recognition of Rosa Luxemburg, occasionally referred to as Rosa-Lux, is a transnational alternative policy lobby group and educational institution, centered in Germany and affiliated to the democratic socialist Left Party. The foundation was established in Berlin in 1990 (originally as the "Social Analysis and Political Education Association").

Goals and Activities
RosaLux's mission is to engage productively with what it sees as a diverse, pluralistic and transnational 'political left', and to help develop its transformative capacities. To this end, the foundation's activities consist of two main tracks: general political education and academic/scientific work.

Through the Institute for Critical Social Analysis, RosaLux delivers critical research on neoliberal capitalism, produces analytic work on political strategy, policy and democratic socialist alternatives, as well as work addressing injustices pertaining to gender, sexuality, race and nation.

Through the Academy for Political Education, the foundation offers extensive programs of political education in the form of public conferences, seminars and workshops, and provides courses for youth and adult learners on topics including economic literacy, gender inequalities, sustainable development and political communication. It engages social movements directly and through media such as its website, public events and through the production of informational materials such as pamphlets.
 
Further, through the Centre for International Dialogue and Cooperation, it engages and supports social movement groups and organizations in Latin America, Africa, Asia, Europe and North America in the form of funding, as well as through seminars and conferences that are organized with local partners.

While the foundation is centered in Germany, its transnational presence and reach is extensive, with 16 foreign offices supporting activities in more than 25 countries.

In 2018, the German state subsidized the work of the foundation with 64 Million Euros.

Controversy
In September 2014, the Rosa Luxemburg Foundation and the Center for Development Studies at Birzeit University organized a conference entitled, "Alternatives to Neo-Liberal Development in the Occupied Palestinian Territories – Critical Perspectives", but left-wing Israeli Haaretz journalist Amira Hass was asked by two Birzeit lecturers to leave on account of a rule against the presence of Israelis. She said that she had attended the university many times and had never heard of such a rule. The international conference's organizers were offended. The regional head of the Rosa Luxembourg Foundation Katja Hermann stated after the incident that she would not have agreed to hold the conference at Birzeit if she was aware of the policy. The university later issued a statement that "The administration has nothing against the presence of the journalist Hass. The university as a national institution differentiates between friends and enemies of the Palestinian people... and works with every person or institution that is against the occupation." In a previous incident, Israeli anti-Zionist historian Ilan Pappé had been invited to deliver a lecture at Birzeit which was held off-campus, as not to infringe with the ban on Israeli Jews.

See also
 Konrad Adenauer Foundation (CDU)
 Heinrich Böll Foundation (Greens)
 Friedrich Ebert Foundation (SPD)
 Friedrich Naumann Foundation (FDP)
 Hanns Seidel Foundation (CSU)
 Desiderius-Erasmus-Stiftung (AfD)

References

External links
  
Rosa-Luxemburg-Stiftung Brussels Office

Political and economic think tanks based in Germany
Political organisations based in Germany
Organisations based in Berlin
Foundations based in Germany
Socialism in Germany
Socialist think tanks
Socialist education
Political and economic research foundations
1990 establishments in Germany
Luxemburgism